Sacred Heart Church is a Roman Catholic Parish church in Exeter, Devon, England. It was built from 1883 to 1884 and designed by Leonard Stokes. It is situated on the corner of South Street and Bear Street, close to Exeter Cathedral in the centre of the city. It is a Gothic Revival church and a Grade II listed building.

History

Foundation
Before the church was built, Roman Catholics congregated for Mass in rooms of houses. The site of the church was previously the Bear Tavern, which before the Dissolution of the Monasteries was the town house of the abbots of Tavistock Abbey. After its completion, the Catholic followers in the city moved from St Nicholas' Priory which was where they previously worshipped.

Construction
Building work on the church started in 1883. The foundation stone was laid by William Vaughan, Bishop of Plymouth. It is the earliest surviving architectural work of Leonard Stokes. At the time, he was in a business partnership with C. E. Ware. On 18 November 1884, the church was opened. Inside, the church was made using materials such as Bath Corsham, Pocombe and Portland stone; the total construction cost approximately £10,000. In 1926, the church tower was completed.

Parish
The church has three Sunday Masses: 5:30 p.m. on Saturday and 9:30 a.m. and 11:00 a.m. on Sunday. There is also a Polish Mass at 2:30 p.m. every Sunday of the month and a Syro-Malabar Mass at 6:00 p.m. every third Sunday of the month. During weekdays there is a 10:00 a.m. Mass from Monday to Saturday.

Exterior

See also
 Roman Catholic Diocese of Plymouth

References

Further reading

External links

 Sacred Heart Parish site

Sacred Heart
Roman Catholic churches in Devon
Grade II listed Roman Catholic churches in England
Grade II listed churches in Devon
Roman Catholic churches completed in 1884
19th-century Roman Catholic church buildings in the United Kingdom
Gothic Revival architecture in Devon
Gothic Revival church buildings in England